The 2017 Vissel Kobe season was Vissel Kobe's fourth consecutive season in the J1 League and their 19th J1 League season overall. They also took part in the 2017 Emperor's Cup and the 2017 J.League Cup.

Squad
As of 8 February 2017.

Out on loan

Competitions

J. League

Tables

Results

Emperor's Cup

J.League Cup

Group stage

Quarter-finals

References

External links
 J.League official site

Vissel Kobe
Vissel Kobe seasons